Russell Conwell Newhouse (1906–1998) made many contributions to the advancement of aviation in a distinguished career running from the late 1920s into the 1970s.  He was the Director of the Radar Laboratory for the Bell Telephone Laboratories
from 1958 to 1968.

Biography
Newhouse was born in Clyde, Ohio, on December 17, 1906. At the age of ten, he moved with his parents to a farm in Delaware County near Ostrander, where he completed his elementary and high school education.

He matriculated at Ohio State University from 1925, graduating in 1929 with a Bachelor of Science in Electrical Engineering degree. His senior thesis, "An Electromagnetic Altimeter", Based on the work of Professor W. L. Everitt, was on the subject of a frequency modulated radio altimeter for aircraft.  He was hired by Bell Laboratories as a member of the technical staff in the Toll Systems Department of the Laboratories.  After three months, he returned to Ohio State under a Fellowship granted by the Guggenheim Fund for the Promotion of Aeronautics to permit work with Professor Everitt to develop the radio altimeter. He received a Master of Science in Electrical Engineering degree in 1930.

While at Ohio State, he joined the Alpha Nu chapter of Pi Kappa Phi fraternity and is considered a notable Pi Kappa Phi.

He received the 1938 Lawrence B. Sperry award for the development and first practical application of the radio altimeter.  In 1939 he transferred to the television research group at Bell Laboratories.  With the approach of war emergency in 1940, he returned to Specialty Products at Bell Laboratories where he supervised the circuit development of a number of radars for aircraft and ground service. By 1947, he was directing the efforts of a group engaged in the development of radar for commercial applications and of radio-telephone sets for aircraft and shipboard service.  He published an article titled "A Voyage by Radar" in the Bell Laboratories Record Vol. XXV No. 5 - May 1947 describing the installation of radar in 1946 on the John T. Hutchinson, one of the (new in 1946) 12,000 ton capacity ships of the Buckeye Steamship Company to demonstrate the advantages of radar as a navigational aid on the Great Lakes.

1961, he was appointed by the FAA Administrator Najeeb Halaby to be a member of Project Beacon, a group which published the "Report of the Task Force on Air Traffic Control" in October 1961.  This report made recommendations for the future of the nation's air navigation and traffic control system.

He was a member of the Millburn Township, New Jersey School Board for many years, and was its president for four of those years.

Newhouse and his wife Clara Lucille have one son, Alan, now a retired senior executive service civilian in the US government whose career focused on nuclear propulsion within the Navy, Atomic Energy Commission, Department of Energy, and NASA.

Major projects
Newhouse was responsible for the development of all of the radars of the Nike Zeus Anti-Missile Missile Defense System, including being responsible for field support, test planning, and data analysis for the Zeus radars in operation at Ascension Island in the South Atlantic: White Sands Missile Range in New Mexico, and Kwajalein Atoll Marshall Islands in the Pacific Ocean. He was also responsible for the development of the Missile Site Array Radar of the Nike X Anti-Missile Defense System.

Awards

 Recipient of the 1967 Pioneer Award Aviation along with Lloyd Espenshied for his work on frequency modulated radio altimeters
 Recipient of The Lawrence Sperry Award – 1938
 The Ohio State University Distinguished Alumni Award, 1959

Patents

External links

 A Voyage by Radar by R.C. Newhouse, Radio Development Engineer, published in the Bell Laboratories Record Vol. XXV No. 5 - May 1947, pages 181-189
 The History of Radar – RC Newhouse of Bell Labs obtained a patent, and his experiments performed throughout the decade eventually led to the radio altimeter, which became operational in 1937.
 Electromagnetic Compatibility Analysis – the problem of terrestrial tracking radar interfering with a geostationary satellite
 Member of the BIRDS OF A FEATHER DEVELOPMENT TEAM, second from left in team photo
 NIST Time Capsule: Giving New Wings to an Old Bat
 IEEE Global History Network Oral-History: Charles H. Townes (1992)
 on Microwave Window Multifactor and its Inhibition 1963 Project Defender ARPA
 Earth Observation on History on Technology Introduction, page 68]
 TRADEX VHF Radar Report
 Chapter 1
 Burials Delaware County (Ohio) Cemeteries

References 

American aviators
20th-century American engineers
1906 births
1998 deaths
Ohio State University College of Engineering alumni